Fibulin-5 (also known as DANCE (developmental arteries and neural crest epidermal growth factor (EGF)-like)) is a protein that in humans is encoded by the FBLN5 gene.

Function 

The protein encoded by this gene is a secreted, extracellular matrix protein containing an Arg-Gly-Asp (RGD) motif and calcium-binding EGF-like domains. It promotes adhesion of endothelial cells through interaction of integrins and the RGD motif. It is prominently expressed in developing arteries but less so in adult vessels. However, its expression is reinduced in balloon-injured vessels and atherosclerotic lesions, notably in intimal vascular smooth muscle cells and endothelial cells. Therefore, the protein encoded by this gene may play a role in vascular development and remodeling.

Interactions 

FBLN5 has been shown to interact with LOXL1 and apolipoprotein(a).

Clinical relevance
FBLN5 mutations have been described in patients with age-related macular degeneration, as well as being involved in Charcot-Marie-Tooth neuropathies.

References

Further reading

External links 
 GeneReview/NIH/UW entry on FBLN5-Related Cutis Laxa